The Huntsville-Madison County Public Library is a public, Carnegie library in Huntsville, Alabama.  Founded in 1818, when Alabama was still a part of the Mississippi Territory, it is the oldest continuing library in the state.

It was first located in the office of attorney John Nelson Spotswood Jones, in the Boardman Building, which is now a part of Constitution Hall Park. The Library also occupied space in the Green Academy from 1821 until Union soldiers burned the school during the Civil War, and moved to borrowed spaces several times until the Carnegie Library opened in 1916. It was designed by Huntsville architect and preservationist Edgar Lee Love. A new building was constructed to accommodate city and county growth, and opened in 1966. The area enjoyed rapid growth with the influx of government employees involved in the development of the space program, including the United States Army and NASA, and the library eventually needed more space as early as 1969. Library officials began planning for a new building in 1983.

The current facility's main branch, sometimes referred to as "Fort Book" for its fortress-like appearance, opened on Monroe Street in April 1987 and serves as the headquarters for the Huntsville Madison County Public Library System. The building contains , has a seating capacity of 930 and contains over 530,000 volumes, with administrative offices located on the third floor.  The library had a circulation of 1,915,548 in 2007, making it the highest-circulating library in Alabama.

The Huntsville-Madison County Public Library received a federal grant from the Library Services and Technology Act in 2004 specifically to digitize photographs from the Library's Archives for inclusion in the Alabama Mosaic Project.

Locations
HMCPL systems owns and operates the Downtown Huntsville Public Library, and 9 branch libraries throughout Madison County:

The Triana branch has a new building after the original was destroyed by fire in late 2009. The new building opened in the spring of 2014, adjacent to the old location.  The Bailey Cove branch was combined with the Eleanor Murphy Branch to create a new South Huntsville Public Library in 2021. The Bessie K. Russell and Shower Branch Libraries were combined to form the North Huntsville Public Library in 2021. The New Hope Public Library relocated in 2022 to a new building on Main Drive in New Hope.

References

External links 
 Huntsville-Madison County Public Library
 Alabama Mosaic Project

County library systems in Alabama
Library buildings completed in 1916
Landmarks in Alabama
Education in Madison County, Alabama
Carnegie libraries in Alabama
Education in Huntsville, Alabama
Buildings and structures in Huntsville, Alabama
1818 establishments in Alabama Territory